Jerónimo Figueroa Cabrera (born 15 July 1982), known as Momo, is a Spanish former professional footballer who played as a winger.

Club career
Born in Las Palmas, Canary Islands, Momo was signed from hometown's UD Las Palmas in 2004 by Deportivo de La Coruña. Rarely used at Depor, he served three loans in four years: Albacete Balompié, Racing de Santander and Segunda División side Xerez CD. His La Liga debut came on 29 August 2004 as he played 33 minutes for Albacete in a 1–0 away loss to Sevilla FC, and all of his five league appearances for the Galicians came during the following season, four of them also from the bench; he was definitely released in August 2008.

For the 2008–09 campaign, already a free agent, Momo remained at Xerez, being instrumental in the Andalusians' first-ever promotion to the top flight by scoring 17 goals in the league alone (fifth-best in the competition). His attacking production decreased significantly the following year as he only found the net on two occasions, both against Málaga CF on 7 March 2010 in a 4–2 away win; he put his team ahead in the fifth minute, then volleyed home the rebound after his penalty kick had been saved by Gustavo Munúa with 18 minutes to go.

In late June 2010, after the club's relegation, Momo signed with neighbouring Real Betis, which in turn had failed to promote. He appeared in 18 games during the season – 13 starts, 980 minutes of action – as this time the goal was achieved, as champions.

References

External links
Las Palmas official profile 

1982 births
Living people
Spanish footballers
Footballers from Las Palmas
Association football wingers
La Liga players
Segunda División players
Tercera División players
UD Las Palmas Atlético players
UD Las Palmas players
Deportivo de La Coruña players
Albacete Balompié players
Racing de Santander players
Xerez CD footballers
Real Betis players